Potamorrhaphis is a genus of freshwater needlefishes native to South America.

Species
Four recognized species are in this genus:
 Potamorrhaphis eigenmanni A. Miranda-Ribeiro, 1915
 Potamorrhaphis guianensis (Jardine, 1843)
 Potamorrhaphis labiatus Sant'Anna, Delapieve & R. E. dos Reis, 2012
 Potamorrhaphis petersi Collette, 1974

References

Belonidae
Taxa named by Albert Günther